DKBA may refer to:
 the Democratic Karen Buddhist Army, an insurgent group that operated in Myanmar from 1994 to 2010
 the Democratic Karen Buddhist Army - Brigade 5 (DKBA-5), an insurgent group that is currently active in Myanmar
 the Dolgoprudnenskoe Scientific Production Plant, formerly abbreviated as DKBA